Jean-Baptiste Gorby (born 25 July 2002) is a French professional footballer who plays as a defensive midfielder for the Portuguese club Braga.

Career
A youth product of Nantes, Gorby moved to the Portuguese club Braga on 14 August 2021. In his first season with Braga, he worked his way up their U19s, then their reserves before reaching their senior team within the span of a couple of months. He made his professional debut for Braga as a late sub in a 2–0 Primeira Liga win over Estoril on 5 December 2021.

References

External links
 
 

2002 births
Living people
Sportspeople from Nantes
French footballers
French sportspeople of Haitian descent
Association football midfielders
S.C. Braga players
Primeira Liga players
French expatriate footballers
French expatriate sportspeople in Portugal
Expatriate footballers in Portugal